The ULULU Company, originally known as The Curiosity Company, is an American production company and animation studio founded in 1997 by Matt Groening, the creator of The Simpsons for Gracie Films. It is behind television series Futurama and Disenchantment and the 1999 television film Olive, the Other Reindeer.

Productions

Original programming

Original films

References

 
Adult animation studios
American animation studios
Companies based in Los Angeles
Mass media companies established in 1997
Television production companies of the United States